William Andrews Hachten (November 30, 1924 – May 15, 2018) was an American football guard who played for the New York Giants. He played college football at Stanford University, having previously attended Huntington Park High School in Huntington Park, California. He is a World War II veteran. He died in May 2018 at the age of 93.

References

1924 births
2018 deaths
American football guards
California Golden Bears football players
New York Giants players
Players of American football from Wichita, Kansas
Stanford Cardinal football players